Kartar Dhillon was a South Asian American political activist and writer from California. Dhillon grew up in the Ghadar Party, working to end British colonialism in India. As an activist, she supported unions, the Black Panther Party, farm workers, political prisoners, and the Korean reunification movement.

Her father Bakhshish Singh Dhillon and her mother Rattan Kaur lived in Oregon and California. Her father wasone of the first Punjabi pioneers to arrive in the United States in 1897. Kartar Dhillon was the fourth child in the family. At the time she was born, their family was the only Indian family in Simi Valley. From 1916 to 1922, she and her family lived in Astoria, Oregon, where she and her siblings attended school and her father worked at a lumber mill. Her family 

During World War II, Dhillon worked as a machinist and truck driver from the Marine Corps. Her youngest brother, Hari, also volunteered for the Marine Corps and was killed in action in Okinawa in 1945 at the age of 18.

She picked crops, worked as a waitress, and was the secretary for the San Francisco, Teamsters and Abestos Worker's unions. She retired in 1983.

Her writing included "The Parrot's Beak," an autobiographical essay about her early life published in Making Waves: An Anthology of Writings By and About Asian American Women. In 1994, at age 80, Dhillon founded the Chaat Collective, a South Asian American art and performance collective.

She died on June 15, 2008 in Berkeley, California. She is survived by two children, nine grandchildren, and seven great-grandchildren.

Writings
 "The Parrot's Beak" (1989)
 "Astoria Revisited And Autobiographical Notes" (1995)

Interviews
 'Witness to the Ghadar Era" (2001)
 "Interview With the Iron Lady" (2001)

Media

 The film Turbans, about a Sikh family in Astoria, Oregon in 1918, is based on Dhillon's memoirs

See also 
 Yuri Kochiyama

References

1915 births
2008 deaths
American human rights activists
American women writers of Indian descent
People from Simi Valley, California
Writers from Berkeley, California
Punjabi people
Activists from California
20th-century American women
20th-century American people
21st-century American women
American people of Indian descent